Sims is an English surname. Notable people with the surname include:

Albert Sims (1871–1962), Australian cricketer
Alexander D. Sims (1803–1848), U.S. Representative from South Carolina
Alexander Sims (racing driver) (born 1988), British racing driver
Amor L. Sims (1896–1978), American US Marine Corps officer
Anthony Sims Jr. (born 1995), American boxer
Art Sims (born 1954), American graphic designer and art director
Ashton Sims (born 1985), Australian rugby league footballer
Barbara Sims (born 1939), American politician
Barry Sims (born 1974), American football player
Bella Sims (born 2005), American swimmer
Bennett Sims (author), American novelist
Betty Sims (1935–2016), American politician
Blake Sims (born 1992), American football player
Brailey Sims (born 1947), Australian mathematician
Brian Sims (born 1978), American politician, member of the Pennsylvania House of Representatives
Bud Sims, American football coach
Cam Sims (born 1996), American football player
Charles Sims (mathematician) (1937–2017), American mathematician
Charles Sims (painter) (1873–1928), British painter
Chloe Sims (born 1981), English television personality
Christopher A. Sims (born 1942), American economist
Chuck Sims (born 1958), American politician
Cliff Sims, American entrepreneur and author
Dave Sims (born 1953), Seattle-based sportscaster
David Sims (director)
Dorothy Sims (disambiguation), multiple people
Douglas Sims II, US Army general
Ed Sims, New Zealand businessman
Edgar A. Sims (1875–1945), American politician
Elisabeth Hoemberg (1909–1994), Canadian historian, born as Elisabeth Sims
Elliot L. Sims, Canadian film and television screenwriter
Ernie Sims (born 1984), American football player
Ezra Sims (1928-2015), American composer
Francis Sims, British trade unionist. 
Freddie Sims (born 1950), American politician
Gareth Sims (born 1983), Zimbabwean former cricketer
George Frederick Sims (1923–1999e), English bookseller and writer
George Robert Sims (1847–1922), British journalist and author
Gill Sims, British author and blogger
Guy A. Sims, American author
Henry Sims (disambiguation), multiple people
Howard "Sandman" Sims (1917–2003), American vaudeville dancer
Hylda Sims (1932–2020), English folk musician
Ilenia Sims (born 2002), English cricketer
Jack Sims (born 1999), English footballer
Jamal Sims, American choreographer and director
James Sims (disambiguation), multiple people
Jaylen Sims (born 1998), American basketball player
Jeff Sims (born 2002), American football player
Jeremy Sims (born 1966), Australian actor
Jericho Sims (born 1998), American basketball player
Jess Sims (born 1990), Welsh bowls player
J. Marion Sims (1813–1883), American surgeon
Jim Sims (1903–1973), English cricketer
Jimmy Sims (born 1953), American footballer
Jinny Sims (born 1952), Indo-Canadian politician and former union activist
Joan Sims (1930–2001), British actress
John Sims (taxonomist) (1749–1831), English physician and botanist
John Sims (footballer) (born 1952), English former professional footballer
John Joseph Sims (1835–1881), English recipient of the Victoria Cross
Johnny Sims (born 1967), American football player
Josh Sims (lacrosse) (born 1978), American professional lacrosse player
Josh Sims (footballer) (born 1997), English professional footballer
Judith Sims (–1996), American journalist, music critic, and magazine editor.
Katherine Sims, American politician
Kathleen Sims (1942–2019), American politician
Kayla Sims (born 1999), American YouTuber
Kenneth Sims (geologist) (born 1959), American professor
Korbin Sims (born 1992), Australian rugby league footballer
Landon Sims (born 2001), American baseball player
Lazarus Sims (born 1972), American former basketball player
Leo Sims, American baseball player
LeShaun Sims (born 1993), American football player
Littlepage Sims, American politician
Lonnie Sims (born 1970), American politician
Lucas Sims (born 1994), American baseball player
Lyndon Sims (1917–1999), Welsh rally driver 
Marian McCamy Sims (1899–1961), American writer
Marvin Sims (born 1957), American former football player
Matthew Simms, English guitarist
Michael Sims (born 1958), American non-fiction writer
Molly Sims (born 1973), American actress and swimsuit model
Monica Sims (1925–2018), British radio producer
Natalie Sims (born 1984), American recording artist and songwriter
Natalie Sims (swimmer) (born 1997), American Paralympic swimmer
Oliver Sims (1943–2015), British computer scientist 
P. Hal Sims (1886–1949), American contract bridge player
Phillip Sims (American football), (born 1992)
Quentin Sims (born 1990), American football player
Ray Sims (1921–2000), American trombonist
Ray Dell Sims (born 1935), American serial killer
Robert Page Sims (1872–1944), American academic, civil rights leader, scientist, and college president
Ronald Hubert Sims (1923–1999) was a British architect and artist
Ruan Sims (born 1982), Australian rugby footballer
Rudy Sims (born 1946) is a Canadian football player
Sanders Sims (1921–2003), American field hockey player
Shane Sims (born 1988), American ice hockey defenseman
Simmie Sims III (Buddy) (born 1993), American rapper, singer, dancer and actor
Stella James Sims (1875–1963), American science professor
Steve Sims (disambiguation), multiple people
Terry Sims (born ), American football coach
Terry Melvin Sims (1942–2000), American convicted murderer
Thetus W. Sims (1852–1939), American politician
Thomas Sims, subject of a notorious American fugitive slave case
Tim Sims (1962–1995), Canadian actor
Toby Sims (born 1997), English footballer
Tom Sims (1950–2012), American snowboarding pioneer
Tom Sims (American football) (born 1967)
Tommy Sims (American football) (born 1964)
Tony Sims (born 1985), American mixed martial artist
Vickie Sims (born 1956), priest
William Sims (1858–1936), American admiral after whom several ships were named
William Dillwyn Sims (1825–1895), English industrialist and artist
William Edward Sims (1842–1891), American lawyer
William H. Sims (American politician) (1837–1920) 
William P. Sims, American politician
Willie Sims (1958-2022), American-Israeli basketball player
Zach Sims, American entrepreneur
Zoot Sims (1925–1985), American saxophonist

References

English-language surnames
Patronymic surnames